Mustapha El-Zaghrari (1949 – June 2013) was a Moroccan footballer. He competed in the men's tournament at the 1972 Summer Olympics.

References

External links
 
 

1949 births
2013 deaths
Moroccan footballers
Morocco international footballers
Olympic footballers of Morocco
Footballers at the 1972 Summer Olympics
Place of birth missing
Wydad AC players
Botola players
Association football forwards